is a sub-kilometer asteroid, classified as a near-Earth object of the Apollo group, approximately  in diameter. It was first observed on 18 October 2012, by Pan-STARRS at Haleakala Observatory on the island of Maui, Hawaii, in the United States. The object was removed from the Sentry Risk Table on 29 December 2013. Due to its presumed small size, it does not qualify as a potentially hazardous asteroid, despite its low Earth MOID.

Orbit and classification 

 is an Apollo asteroid, which are Earth-crossers and the largest subgroup in the near-Earth object population. It orbits the Sun at a distance of 0.996–1.22 AU once every 14 months (424 days; semi-major axis of 1.11 AU). Its orbit has an eccentricity of 0.10 and an inclination of 10° with respect to the ecliptic. The body's observation arc begins with its official first observation at Haleakala in October 2012.

Close encounters 

For comparison, the distance to the Moon is about 0.0026 AU (384,400 km).

Despite this exceptionally low theoretical distance, the asteroid is not listed as a potentially hazardous asteroid, due to its small size, represented by its proxy, an absolute magnitude of 23.3, which is below the defined threshold of 22 magnitude.

Numbering and naming 

This minor planet has not been numbered by the Minor Planet Center and remains unnamed.

Physical characteristics 

Based on a generic magnitude-to-diameter conversion,  measures 66 meters in diameter, for an absolute magnitude of 23.3 and an assumed albedo of 0.20, which is typical for stony S-type asteroids. In the unusual case of being a carbonaceous asteroid with a low albedo of 0.05,  may be as large as 130 meters in diameter.

References

External links 
 MPEC 2012-U61 : 2012 UE34, Minor Planet Electronic Circular, 20 October 2012
 MPEC 2019-N158 : 2012 UE34, Minor Planet Electronic Circular, 14 July 2019
  , includes discussion of 
  at NEODyS-2
 Physical facts sheet, European Asteroid Research Node (EARN), 18 October 2012
 List Of The Potentially Hazardous Asteroids (PHAs), Minor Planet Center
 
 
 

Minor planet object articles (unnumbered)

19910408
20121018